Adam Krzysztof Struzik (born 1 January 1957 in Kutno, Poland) is a Polish medical doctor and politician, serving as the current Marshal of Masovian Voivodeship since December 2001. Struzik previously served as Marshal of the Polish Senate between 1993 and 1997.

References

1957 births
Living people
People from Kutno
Polish People's Party politicians
Members of the Polish Sejm 2007–2011
Members of the Senate of Poland 1993–1997
Senat Marshals
Voivodeship marshals of Poland
Masovian Voivodeship
University of Warsaw alumni